Kgosiemang is a surname. Notable people with the surname include:

Kabelo Kgosiemang (born 1986), Botswana high-jumper
Constance Kgosiemang (1946–2012), Namibian tribal chief
 

Surnames of African origin